Casacalenda-Guardalfiera railway station is the railway station serving the municipalities of Casacalenda and Guardalfiera, Italy. It is situated in the centre of Casacalenda.

References

External links

Railway stations in Molise
Railway stations opened in 1883